Psalterium may refer to:

 Psalterium (book), book of Psalms
 Psalterium (instrument), a stringed musical instrument, the name of which is synonymous with the psaltery
 Psalterium (neuroanatomy), a structure in the commissure of fornix
 Psalterium Georgii, a constellation
 Omasum, the third stomach of ruminants

See also
 
 Psalteriomonas